Garforth and Swillington is a ward and Swillington is a civil parish in the metropolitan borough of the City of Leeds, West Yorkshire, England.  The ward and parish contain 23 listed buildings that are recorded in the National Heritage List for England.  Of these, two are listed at Grade II*, the middle of the three grades, and the others are at Grade II, the lowest grade.  The area covered by the list includes the town of Garforth, the village of Swillington, and the surrounding countryside.  The listed buildings include houses and associated structures, farmhouses, churches, a sundial in a churchyard, road and railway bridges, and mileposts.


Key

Buildings

References

Citations

Sources

 

Lists of listed buildings in West Yorkshire